

Viscount Long, of Wraxall in the County of Wiltshire, is a title in the Peerage of the United Kingdom.

It was created in 1921 for the Conservative politician Walter Long, who had previously served as Member of Parliament, President of the Board of Agriculture, President of the Local Government Board, Secretary of State for the Colonies and First Lord of the Admiralty. His grandson, the second Viscount (son of Brigadier General Walter Long) was killed in action in the Second World War. He was succeeded by his uncle, the third Viscount, who had earlier represented Westbury in Parliament as a Conservative. The title was next held by his son, the fourth Viscount, who served as a government whip from 1979 to 1997 in the Conservative administrations of Margaret Thatcher and John Major. However, Lord Long lost his seat in the House of Lords after the passing of the House of Lords Act 1999.  the title is held by the latter's son, the fifth Viscount, who  succeeded in that year.

Richard Chaloner, 1st Baron Gisborough, was the younger brother of the first Viscount. Child actress Charlotte Long was the daughter of the fourth Viscount.

Viscounts Long (1921)
Walter Hume Long, 1st Viscount Long (1854–1924)
Walter Long (1879–1917)
Walter Francis David Long, 2nd Viscount Long (1911–1944)
Richard Eric Onslow Long, 3rd Viscount Long (1892–1967)
Richard Gerard Long, 4th Viscount Long (1929–2017)
James Richard Long, 5th Viscount Long (b. 1960)

There is no heir to the title.

See also
Baron Gisborough
Rood Ashton House

Further reading 
Inheriting the Earth: The Long Family's 500 Year Reign in Wiltshire; Cheryl Nicol

References 

 Kidd, Charles, Williamson, David (editors). Debrett's Peerage and Baronetage (1990 edition). New York: St Martin's Press, 1990.
 

Viscountcies in the Peerage of the United Kingdom
Viscount
Noble titles created in 1921
Noble titles created for UK MPs